The first season of Bake Off Celebridades premiered on Saturday, February 20, 2021, at  (BRT / AMT) on SBT, aiming to find the best celebrity baker in Brazil.

Bakers
It featured two returning contestants: Gabriel Santana (from Bake Off SBT 1) and Maisa Silva (from Bake Off SBT 3).

The following is a list of contestants:

Results summary

Key
  Advanced
  Judges' favourite bakers
  Star Baker
  Eliminated
  Judges' bottom bakers
  Returned
  Runner-up
  Winner

Technical challenges ranking

Key
  Star Baker
  Eliminated

Ratings and reception

Brazilian ratings
All numbers are in points and provided by Kantar Ibope Media.

References

External links 
 Bake Off Celebridades on SBT

2021 Brazilian television seasons